Richard Scrimger is a Canadian writer who has published fourteen books since 1996.  He is best known for his children's literature, but has also written three books for adults: Crosstown, Still Life With Children and Mystical Rose.  A winner of the Mr. Christie Award (for The Nose From Jupiter) and recipient of dozens of award nominations, Scrimger is a favourite with many children and adults.  All of his novels except The Boy From Earth and Still Life With Children have been short-listed for readers' choice awards.  Several of his books have been named to Best-of, or Top-ten, or Notable lists by various libraries and publications, including Young Adult Library Services Association, Chicago Public Library, American Library Association, Time Out New York Kids, The Globe and Mail, Quill & Quire.  His books have been translated into Dutch, French, German, Thai, Korean, Portuguese, Slovenian, Italian, and Polish.

Life and work 

Scrimger was born in Montreal, Quebec, Canada in 1957, moving to Toronto, Ontario at the age of 2.  He attended Edgewood Public School, Deer Park Public School and North Toronto Collegiate Institute.  He describes himself as "a combination class clown and nerd", earning both scholarships and detentions.  In 1979 he graduated from the University of Toronto with honours in History and English.  After university he worked as a waiter and traveled in Europe.  It was there that he started his first novel, which he describes as "a stinker". It was never published.

He returned to Toronto, got married and started a family, working at restaurants in the evenings and looking after his children during the day.  In the early 1990s the plight of the homeless people he passed on his way to and from work in downtown Toronto caught his attention.  They later became the inspiration for Crosstown (1996, Riverbank Press) a book which is by turns tragic and laugh out loud amusing, a combination which Scrimger maintained through most of his works.

While attending a one-week writing program at the Humber College School for Writers, Scrimger wrote a humorous story about a stay-at-home dad going shopping with his kids.  That piece and others like it were published in The Globe and Mail, and later turned into the book Still Life With Children (1997, HarperCollins).

Claire Mackay, a family friend and well-known children's writer herself, asked Scrimger to contribute to her humorous collection, Laughs.  "Introducing Norbert" is about an alien who lives in a boy's nose. The story was later converted into a novel, The Nose From Jupiter (1998, Tundra Books).  The book was a roaring success, leading to three more Norbert books, A Nose For Adventure, Noses Are Red, and The Boy From Earth, all published by Tundra Books.

The Way to Schenectady (1998) is based loosely on childhood motor trips to the east coast.  Its sequel, Of Mice and Nutcrackers (2001) is based on Scrimger's own amateur theatrical career.

Mystical Rose (2000), a dementing woman's prayer and life, has no literal basis in Scrimger's own past or present – except, as he says, insofar as we are all only one corner away from personal disintegration.

Tundra Books provided the impetus for Scrimger's Bun Bun stories, illustrated by Gillian Johnson. These three picture books are very loosely based around his own kids' lives, borrowing in tone from Russell Hoban's books about Frances the badger.

Charlie Fairmile, in From Charlie's Point of View (2005), is blind because Scrimger liked the idea of a blind hero, and because Scrimger is extremely short-sighted himself.  From Charlie's Point of View was originally written as a 26-page TV script.  It took Scrimger a year to flesh it out into a book.

As a child, Scrimger lived in Scarborough. The creek at the bottom of his back yard became the setting for his 2007 novel, Into the Ravine.

His book, Me & Death: An Afterlife Adventure, appeared in April 2010.  Jim, a fourteen-year-old juvenile delinquent is run over by a car.  What follows is an adventure in the afterworld.

Richard Scrimger lives in Toronto, Ontario and teaches at the Humber College School for Writers in Toronto.  His children, now adults, are both his inspiration and the most important part of his life. He wrote a book in the seven series and the book was called ink me

Bibliography

Novels for Children

 The Way to Schenectady – 1998
 Of Mice & Nutcrackers – 2001
 From Charlie's Point of View – 2005
 Into the Ravine – 2007
 Ink Me - 2012
 The Wolf and Me - 2014

The Nose from Jupiter series
 The Nose From Jupiter  – 1998
 A Nose For Adventure – 2000
 Noses Are Red – 2002
 The Boy from Earth – 2004

Novels for Adults
 Crosstown – 1996
 Still Life With Children – 1997
 Mystical Rose –  2000

Picture Books
 Bun Bun's Birthday – 2001
 Princess Bun Bun – 2002
 Eugene's Story – 2003

References 
 CM magazine profile – incorporating material from a 1998 interview
Richard Scrimger at the Canadian Society of Children's Authors, Illustrators, and Performers (CANSCAIP.org) 
Profile by Writers' Circle of Durham
Norbert's home page
BookLounge.ca Author Spotlight

External links 
 
Humber School for Writers
 
 

1957 births
Canadian children's writers
Living people
Writers from Montreal